Dăneasa is a commune in Olt County, Muntenia, Romania. It is composed of five villages: Berindei, Cioflanu, Dăneasa, Pestra and Zănoaga.

Natives
 Dumitru Popovici

References

Communes in Olt County
Localities in Muntenia